Sudar Oli ( Cuṭar Oḷi) is a Tamil language Sri Lankan daily newspaper published by Mass Media Syndicate (Private) Limited, part of the Uthayan Group of Newspapers. It was founded in 2000 and is published from Colombo. Its sister newspaper is the Jaffna based Uthayan. The newspaper has been attacked several times, a number of its staff have been murdered by paramilitary groups and other forces, and it regularly receives threats.

History
Sudar Oli was founded in Colombo on 10 September 2000 as a weekly newspaper. It became a daily newspaper on 29 October 2001. Nadesapillai Vithyatharan became the paper's editor in 2002.

In July 2006 Sudar Oli and Thinakkural were forced to stop distribution in Batticaloa District and Ampara District after receiving threatening phone calls allegedly from a government backed paramilitary headed by Karuna Amman. Both papers resumed distribution in the districts later but circulation had fallen.

Editor N. Vithyatharan was arrested by the police without a warrant on 26 February 2009 as he attended a funeral in Mount Lavinia without a warrant and allegedly beaten in custody. As international criticism of the arrest intensified the Sri Lankan government claimed Vithyatharan had been arrested in connections with the LTTE air raid on Colombo. Vithyatharan was released on 24 April 2009 after the Colombo Crimes Division informed the court that there was no evidence connecting him to the air raid. Vithyatharan alleged that he had been detained in order to prevent him highlighting the plight of the civilians in the Vanni.

Attacks
Sudar Oli and its employees have been subject to numerous attacks:

 News photographer Yathurshan Premachchandran was attacked by activists from the nationalist Janatha Vimukthi Peramuna (JVP) party on 23 August 2005 as he covered a JVP demonstration in front of Fort Railway Station, Colombo. The JVP activists accused Premachchandran of being a member of the rebel Liberation Tigers of Tamil Eelam.
 Two grenades were thrown into the advertising office of the Sudar Oli and Uthayan in Wellawatte, Colombo on 20 August 2005, but failed to explode.
 Two grenades were thrown into the offices of the newspaper in Grandpass, Colombo on 29 August 2005, killing security guard David Selvaratnam and injuring three others.
 Two parliamentary reporters were attacked as they waited for a bus on 30 August 2005.
 Journalist Subramaniyam Sugirdharajan (Sugitharajah) was shot dead in Trincomalee near governor's secretariat on 24 January 2006. Sugirdharajan had provided photographic evidence to the media of the murder of five students by Sri Lankan security forces. The day before his death Sugirdharajan had written an article in the Sudar Oli exposing abuses committed by the Eelam People's Democratic Party, a government backed paramilitary group, in the Trincomalee area.

See also
 List of newspapers in Sri Lanka

References

External links
 

Daily newspapers published in Sri Lanka
Newspapers established in 2000
Tamil-language newspapers published in Sri Lanka
Uthayan Group of Newspapers
Mass media in Colombo